Dragonmaster or Dragon master may refer to:

People
 Kazuo Sakurada (born 1948), who wrestled as "The Dragonmaster"

Characters
 Richard Dragon, Kung-Fu Master (comics) fictional character, also called "Master Dragon"
 Dragonmaster, a class of fictional character from RPG videogame series Lunar

Literature
 "The Dragon Masters" (1962 novella), science fiction work by Jack Vance
 Master of Dragons (2005 novel), fantasy novel by Margaret Weiss
 The Dragonmaster, a novel written by Richard Brightfield
 Dragonmaster Trilogy, a novel trilogy by Chris Bunch

Games
 Dragon Master (1994 videogame), a 1994 fighting arcade game
 Dragonmaster (card game), a variant of Barbu

See also
 Mistress of Dragons (2003 novel), fantasy novel by Margaret Weiss
 Mother of Dragons, Daenerys Targaryen, from "A Song of Ice and Fire" by George R.R. Martin
 Dragon Mother, Longmu (龙母; 龍母), mythological woman who fostered five dragons
 Lord Toruk the Dragonfather, RPG fictional character from Warmachine and Iron Kingdoms
 Dragon (disambiguation)
 Master (disambiguation)